Planá nad Lužnicí is a town in Tábor District in the South Bohemian Region of the Czech Republic. It has about 4,300 inhabitants.

Administrative parts

Village of Lhota Samoty and town part of Strkov are administrative parts of Planá nad Lužnicí.

Geography
Planá nad Lužnicí is urbanistically fused with the neighbouring town of Sezimovo Ústí in the north. It lies in the Tábor Uplands. The town is situated on the river Lužnice. There are several fish ponds in the municipal territory.

History
Planá nad Lužnicí was first mentioned in a letter of bishop Tobiáš of Bechyně from 1288–1289, when it was part of the Prague episcopacy. From the time Oldřich of Ústí came to power until 1547, Planá was a dependency of the newly established Hussite town of Tábor. Then the town was bought by William of Rosenberg, who had a wooden bridge over the Lužnice river built. The estate was inherited by Peter Vok of Rosenberg, at the end of the 17th century it was taken over by the Sternbergs and later by the House of Lobkowicz.

After 1848, Planá became an independent municipality, which developed also thanks to the construction of the railway line (1869) and timber rafting, which ran here until 1946.

Demographics

Economy
A production plant of MADETA a.s., the largest dairy in the country, is located here since 1969. It is the biggest plant for natural cheeses in the country.

The largest employer with its headquarters in Planá nad Lužnici is SILON s.r.o. The company was originally founded as a polyamide filament yarn producer in 1950. Later it focused on silon production (improved nylon for women's stockings invented by Otto Wichterle). Today it is a producer of polyolefin based performance compounds and polyester fibres.

Transport
Planá nad Lužnicí lies on the Prague–České Budějovice railway.

The D3 motorway runs alongside the town.

Sights

The originally gothic Church of Saint Wenceslaus was rebuilt in 1666. Another reconstruction took place in 1796, when the tower was built. There is a sundial on the wall of the church.

Architecturally valuable is the rectory from 1784 with bossed corners and a covered mansard roof.

Strkov Castle was built in 1903. Today it is privately owned. It has a castle park on the shore of Strkovský pond.

Notable people
František Douda (1908–1990), shot putter, Olympic medalist

Twin towns – sister cities

Planá nad Lužnicí is twinned with:
 Gorenja Vas–Poljane, Slovenia
 Hluk, Czech Republic

References

External links

Cities and towns in the Czech Republic
Populated places in Tábor District